Anarsia is a genus of moths in the family Gelechiidae.

Species

Anarsia acaciae Walsingham, 1896
Anarsia acerata Meyrick, 1913
Anarsia acrotoma Meyrick, 1913
Anarsia agricola Walsingham, 1891
Anarsia albibasella Janse, 1963
Anarsia aleurodes Meyrick, 1922
Anarsia altercata Meyrick, 1918
Anarsia amalleuta Meyrick, 1913
Anarsia amegarta Meyrick, 1933
Anarsia anisodonta Diakonoff 1954
Anarsia anthracaula Meyrick, 1929
Anarsia antisaris (Meyrick, 1913)
Anarsia arachniota Meyrick, 1925
Anarsia arsenopa Meyrick, 1920
Anarsia aspera Park, 1995
Anarsia asymmetrodes Park, 2014
Anarsia austerodes (Meyrick, 1918)
Anarsia balioneura Meyrick, 1921
Anarsia beitunica Li & Zheng, 1997
Anarsia belutschistanella (Amsel, 1959)
Anarsia bilbainella Rössler 1877
Anarsia bimaculata Ponomarenko, 1989
Anarsia bipinnata (Meyrick, 1932)
Anarsia callicosma Janse, 1960
Anarsia carbonaria Meyrick, 1913
Anarsia centrospila (Turner, 1919)
Anarsia chaonella Park, 1995
Anarsia chiangmaiensis Park & Ponomarenko, 1996
Anarsia choana Park, 1995 
Anarsia citromitra Meyrick, 1921
Anarsia conica Park & Ponomarenko, 1996
Anarsia crassipalpella Legrand, 1966
Anarsia decora Li & Zheng, 1997
Anarsia dejoannisi Rössler, 1994
Anarsia didymopa Meyrick 1916
Anarsia dodonaea 
Anarsia dryinopa Lower 1897
Anarsia eburnella Christoph, 1887
Anarsia eleagnella Kuznetsov, 1957
Anarsia elongata Park, 1995
Anarsia ephippias Meyrick, 1908
Anarsia epiula Meyrick 1904
Anarsia epotias Meyrick, 1916
Anarsia eriozona (Meyrick, 1921)
Anarsia euphorodes Meyrick, 1922
Anarsia eutacta Meyrick, 1921
Anarsia eximia Li & Zheng, 1997
Anarsia gajiensis Park & Ponomarenko, 1996
Anarsia geminella Amsel, 1967
Anarsia gravata Meyrick, 1911
Anarsia guiera Bradley, 1969
Anarsia halimodendri Christoph, 1877
Anarsia hippocoma Meyrick 1921
Anarsia idioptila  Meyrick, 1916
Anarsia incerta  Ueda, 1997
Anarsia inculta Walsingham, 1891
Anarsia innoxiella Gregersen & Karsholt, 2017
Anarsia isogona Meyrick, 1913
Anarsia largimacularis  Li & Zheng, 1997
Anarsia leberonella Real, 1994
Anarsia lechriosema Bradley, 1982
Anarsia leucophora Meyrick 1904
Anarsia lewvanichae Park & Ponomarenko, 1996
Anarsia libanoticella Amsel, 1967
Anarsia lineatella Zeller 1839
Anarsia longipalpella Rebel, 1907
Anarsia luticostella Chrétien, 1915
Anarsia magnibimaculata Li & Zheng, 1997
Anarsia malagasyella Viette, 1968
Anarsia meiosis Park & Ponomarenko, 1996
Anarsia melanchropa Meyrick, 1926
Anarsia melanoplecta Meyrick, 1914
Anarsia minutella (Turati, 1929)
Anarsia mitescens Meyrick, 1913
Anarsia molybdota Meyrick 1904
Anarsia nigricana Park, 1991
Anarsia nigrimacula Janse, 1949
Anarsia nimbosa Meyrick, 1913
Anarsia novitricornis Li & Zheng, 1997
Anarsia nuristanella Amsel, 1967
Anarsia omoptila Meyrick, 1918
Anarsia ovula Park & Ponomarenko, 1996
Anarsia paraisogona Park & Ponomarenko, 1996
Anarsia parkae Rose and Pathania, 2003
Anarsia patulella Walker, 1864
Anarsia pensilis Meyrick, 1913
Anarsia permissa Meyrick, 1926
Anarsia phortica Meyrick, 1913
Anarsia pinnata Meyrick, 1931
Anarsia procera Park & Ponomarenko, 1996
Anarsia protensa Park, 1995
Anarsia psammobia Falkovitsh & Bidzilya, 2003
Anarsia pustulata Janse, 1949
Anarsia reciproca Meyrick, 1920
Anarsia retamella Chrétien, 1915
Anarsia renukaensis Rose and Pathania, 2003
Anarsia sagittaria Meyrick, 1914
Anarsia sagmatica Meyrick, 1916
Anarsia sciograpta (Meyrick, 1921)
Anarsia sciotona Meyrick, 1927
Anarsia semnopa Meyrick, 1921
Anarsia sibirica Park & Ponomarenko, 1996
Anarsia silvosa Ueda, 1997
Anarsia spartiella (Schrank, 1802)
Anarsia spatulana Park & Ponomarenko, 1996
Anarsia spicata Meyrick, 1918
Anarsia squamerecta Li & Zheng, 1997
Anarsia stepposella Ponomarenko, 2002
Anarsia sthenarota Meyrick, 1926
Anarsia stylota Meyrick, 1913
Anarsia subfulvescens Meyrick, 1918
Anarsia subnigricana Park & Ponomarenko, 1996
Anarsia tanyharensis Rose and Pathania, 2003
Anarsia taurella Bradley, 1961
Anarsia tegumentus Rose and Pathania, 2003
Anarsia tortuosa (Meyrick, 1913)
Anarsia tortuosella Amsel, 1967
Anarsia tremata 
Anarsia triaenota Meyrick, 1913
Anarsia tricornis Meyrick, 1913
Anarsia triglypta Meyrick, 1933
Anarsia ulmarata Bradley, 1961
Anarsia ulneongensis Park & Ponomarenko, 1996
Anarsia valvata Rose and Pathania, 2003
Anarsia vectaria Meyrick, 1918
Anarsia veruta Meyrick, 1918
Anarsia vinsonella Viette, 1957

Former species
Anarsia cyrtopleura (Turner, 1919)

References

 , 2002: New Palaearctic species of the genus Anarsia Zeller, 1839 (Gelechiidae, Lepidoptera). Far Eastern entomologist, 115: 1-4.

External links
 Anarsia at funet
 Anarsia at environment.gov.au
 Afromoths (for the African species)

 
Anarsiini
Moth genera
Taxa named by Philipp Christoph Zeller